Jabberjaw is an American animated television series created by Joe Ruby and Ken Spears and produced by Hanna-Barbera which aired 16 original episodes on ABC from September 11 to December 18, 1976. Reruns continued on ABC until September 3, 1978.

Premise
Jabberjaw, a 15-foot amphibious great white shark, is the drummer for The Neptunes, a rock group made up of four teenagers — Biff, Shelly, Bubbles and Clamhead — who live in an underwater civilization in the year 2076. Jabberjaw and The Neptunes travel to various underwater cities where they encounter and deal with assorted megalomaniacs and supervillains who want to conquer the undersea world.

Like a great deal of Hanna-Barbera's 1970s output, the format and writing for Jabberjaw was similar to that for Scooby-Doo, Josie and the Pussycats and Speed Buggy. The show also drew inspiration (in the use of a shark as a character) from the overall shark mania of the mid-1970s caused by the then-recent film Jaws. It also shared The Flintstones penchant for making use of puns as the names of locations, people, etc., in this case, ocean-themed puns (such as "Aqualaska" instead of Alaska). Every episode ended with a musical chase sequence where Jabberjaw and the gang would run from the villains, performing zany cartoon antics in order to escape while a song by The Neptunes played in the background.

Characters

 Jabberjaw (voiced by Frank Welker impersonating Curly Howard) – An air-breathing, Brooklyn-accented anthropomorphic great white shark. Jabberjaw found it hard to get respect in a society where "shark ejectors" (robots that would guard various buildings or cities from sharks entering) were commonplace. These robots, as well as unpleasant treatment from others, frequently prompt him to utter some variation of his catchphrase (borrowed from the comedian Rodney Dangerfield): "I don't get no respect!" He has the unique ability to change his shape or adapt himself to act like various objects such as a trampoline, parachute, jack, throw rug, etc., either to get himself and the gang out of a jam, or just to hide.
 Biff (voiced by Tommy Cook) – An athletic, handsome, white-skinned brown-haired young man who is the band's guitar player and level-headed leader who books all the gigs. In many episodes, his hair is drawn black. His main catchphrase is "Jumpin' jellyfish!" (occasionally, "Hoppin' halibut!")
 Shelly (voiced by Patricia Parris) – A white-skinned dark-haired young woman who plays tambourine and sings backup vocals for The Neptunes. She is attractive and intelligent, but haughty, vain, and abrasive (like Josie and the Pussycats' Alexandra) and considers herself to be the star of the band. While she holds a great deal of disdain for Jabberjaw (or "Blubberhead" as she calls him), she does have some grudging fondness for him deep down and occasionally shows it.
 Bubbles (voiced by Julie McWhirter) – A young white-skinned woman with blonde curly hair who plays keyboard for The Neptunes. She is extremely ditzy and dimwitted, has a cute giggle, similar to Josie and the Pussycats' Melody. Shelly sometimes nicknames her "Ding-a-Ling" or "Bubblehead". Whenever she volunteers to help, she usually ends up messing it up.
 Clamhead (voiced by Barry Gordon) – A tall and slim, white-skinned red-haired young man who plays bass for The Neptunes and is Jabberjaw's best friend. His catchphrases are crying out "Abba-abba-abba!" and "Wowee-wow-wow-wow!" (or some variation, commonly featuring the word "zowie") whenever he gets excited.

Broadcast history
Sixteen 30-minute episodes of Jabberjaw were produced, which aired on ABC Saturday Morning from September 11, 1976, to September 3, 1977, and rebroadcast for a second season of reruns on Sunday Morning from September 11, 1977, to September 3, 1978. In the 1980s, repeats resurfaced as part of USA Cartoon Express on USA Network, in the 1990s on Cartoon Network and in the 2000s on Boomerang. This is one of a number of shows made before the mid-1980s seen on the Cartoon Network and Boomerang to have been taken from PAL prints.

Like many animated series created by Hanna-Barbera in the 1970s, the show contained a laugh track created by the studio.Broadcast schedules (all EDT)''':
September 11, 1976 – November 27, 1976, ABC Saturday 9:00-9:30 AM
December 4, 1976 – September 3, 1977, ABC Saturday 8:30-9:00 AM
September 11, 1977 – September 3, 1978, ABC Sunday 10:30-11:00 AM

Episodes

Other appearances

 Jabberjaw appeared as a guest announcer or referee on the Laff-A-Lympics segment of Scooby's All-Star Laff-A-Lympics / Scooby's All-Stars in the episodes "Mexico and England" (1977), "India and Israel" (1977), "Africa and California" (1977), "New York and Turkey" (1978) and "Louisiana and Atlantis" (1978).
 Jabberjaw made a special guest appearance at a celebrity roast honoring Fred Flintstone on the TV special Hanna-Barbera's All-Star Comedy Ice Revue (1978). In this appearance, Jabberjaw is voiced by Don Messick.
 Jabberjaw co-starred on the short-lived 1978 series Yogi's Space Race in which he participated in intergalactic racing competitions with Yogi Bear, Huckleberry Hound and other characters; his racing partner was a lazy bloodhound named Buford (from The Buford Files of Buford and the Galloping Ghost) and their race ship contained a track on which Buford ran to increase speed. Jabber and Buford were both voiced by Frank Welker.
 Jabberjaw also appeared in the medium of comic books. He made appearances in Laff-A-Lympics issues #8 through #12 published by Marvel Comics in 1978–79. He also appeared in Hanna-Barbera Presents Superstar Olympics (issue #6) published by Archie Comics in 1996 and Cartoon Network Presents Jabberjaw (issue #23) published by DC Comics in 1999. Charlton Comics was originally set to publish a Jabberjaw comic series in 1977, but it was cancelled. In France, Norbert Fersen adapted the show into a comic strip under its French translated name Mantalo and featured in the magazines Télé Junior, Télé Parade and Télé BD (1978–81).
 Jabberjaw and Shelly starred in two 1979 educational filmstrips – The Silent Hunters and A Whale of a Tale – as part of the Hanna-Barbera Educational Filmstrips series distributed in classroom environments.Jabberjaw: A Whale of a Tale at WorldCat
 Jabberjaw made a cameo appearance in the episode "Goodbye, Mr. Chump" on Yogi's Treasure Hunt (1987), voiced again by Frank Welker.
 Jabberjaw and The Neptunes appeared on Cartoon Network Groovies in a music video set to Pain's "Jabberjaw (Running Underwater)" (1999) in which they are portrayed as a ska band with the group dressed in modern clothing.
 Jabberjaw appeared on the TV special Night of the Living Doo (2001) trying to take out Scooby-Doo and the Mystery Inc. gang so he can finally get his respect. Frank Welker reprised the role of Jabberjaw.
 Jabberjaw and The Neptunes made sporadic appearances on Harvey Birdman, Attorney at Law in the episodes "Shoyu Weenie" (2002), "The Dabba Don" (2002), "Back to the Present" (2004), "Peanut Puberty" (2004), "Identity Theft" (2005), "Juror in Court" (2007) and "The Death of Harvey" (2007). Frank Welker reprised the role of Jabberjaw and voiced Biff while Clamhead was later voiced by Steve Blum.
 Jabberjaw made a cameo, sitting in the movie theater with other Hanna-Barbera/Cartoon Network/Warner Bros. characters on the opening Cartoon Network logo from The Powerpuff Girls Movie (2002).
 Jabberjaw made a cameo appearance in the Johnny Bravo episode "Johnny Bravo Goes to Hollywood" (2004).
 Jabberjaw appeared on Sealab 2021 in the episode "Return of Marco" (2004). He was one of many sharks impaled with spears by an aquatic tribe of cave dwellers.
 Jabberjaw and The Neptunes appeared on Scooby-Doo! Mystery Incorporated in the episode "Mystery Solvers Club State Finals" (2011) alongside other Hanna-Barbera mystery teams in a fever dream of Scooby-Doo's. Frank Welker reprised the role of Jabberjaw.
 Jabberjaw made a cameo appearance in a 2012 MetLife commercial entitled "Everyone".
 Jabberjaw and The Neptunes appeared in the Robot Chicken episode "Things Look Bad for the Streepster" (2018) with Jabberjaw voiced by Tom Sheppard. Jabberjaw goes on vacation to Amity Island and runs into the cast of Jaws, only to be killed by them. Bruce takes Jabberjaw's place in The Neptunes.
 In 2018, DC Comics rebooted Jabberjaw into a less cartoonish character and featured him, and the Neptunes in a crossover with Aquaman, Aquaman/Jabberjaw Special #1.
 Jabberjaw and The Neptunes appeared in the Wacky Races episode "Far Away In Old Bombay" (2018).
 Jabberjaw appears in the end credits of the film Scoob! as a new recruit of the Blue Falcon's Falcon Force, and he appears to be gender-swapped. He/She was originally planned to have a larger role (and voiced by Lizzo) but the concept was removed from the final film.
 Jabberjaw appeared in the 2021 film Space Jam: A New Legacy. He is seen watching the basketball game between the Tune Squad and the Goon Squad.
 A genderbend version of Jabberjaw is featured in the series Jellystone! (2021), voiced by Niccole Thurman. She is one of Magilla Gorilla's employees in his clothing store along with Loopy De Loop. The Neptunes also make appearances. Biff is more tanned and has lighter brown hair in this version.
 Jabberjaw appeared in the 2021 special Scooby-Doo, Where Are You Now! voiced again by Frank Welker.
 Jabberjaw appeared in the Family Guy episode, "Lawyer Guy" (2022). He appears on a selfie with Peter Griffin's friends and Brick Baker.

Merchandising
In 1977–78, Rand McNally released two coloring books (Jabberjaw and The Neptunes and Jabberjaw Does It Again), a story book (Jabberjaw Out West by Jean Lewis, illustrated by Jim Franzen) and a read & color book (Jabberjaw and the Rustlers).

Other merchandise in the late 1970s–early 1980s included a lunchbox and thermos, iron-on transfers, jigsaw puzzles, Presto Magix, bubble maker set, a school tablet, Avon pendant, a plush toy and Hanna-Barbera Marineland Jabberjaw picture viewer.

In 2005, a Jabberjaw Wacky Wobbler bobblehead figure was released by Funko.

Home media
On July 28, 1988, an 85-minute videocassette of Jabberjaw containing four episodes ("Dr. Lo Has Got to Go", "There's No Place Like Outer Space", "The Sourpuss Octopuss" and "The Great Shark Switch") was released by Worldvision Home Video.

On February 15, 2011, Warner Archive released Jabberjaw: The Complete Series on DVD in region 1 as part of their Hanna–Barbera Classics Collection. This is a manufacture-on-demand (MOD) release, available exclusively through Warner's online store and Amazon.com.

See also
List of works produced by Hanna-Barbera Productions
List of Hanna-Barbera characters

References

External links

Jabberjaw at The Big Cartoon DataBase
Cartoon Network: Dept. of Cartoons: Jabberjaw – cached copy from Internet Archives
The Cartoon Scrapbook – Information and details on Jabberjaw''.
Jabberjaw at Don Markstein's Toonopedia. Archived.

1976 American television series debuts
1978 American television series endings
1970s American animated television series
1970s American musical comedy television series
American children's animated comedy television series
American children's animated musical television series
American Broadcasting Company original programming
Animated musical groups
Animated television series about fish
English-language television shows
Fictional musical groups
Fictional sharks
Anthropomorphic fish
Underwater civilizations in fiction
Television series set in the 2070s
Television series set in the future
Television series by Hanna-Barbera
Hanna-Barbera characters
Television series created by Joe Ruby
Television series created by Ken Spears
Male characters in animation
Teen animated television series